is an aquarium located in Tsuruoka, Yamagata Prefecture, Japan. In 2005, it exceeded Monterey Bay Aquarium in California regarding the number of jellyfish display types and holds the Guinness World Records for this exhibition.

History

The facility was on the edge of bankruptcy again in the late 90's.
Until then, jellyfish exhibits at aquariums were extraordinary, and there was no breeding methods. In addition, the Kamo does not have enough money. In such a situation, the director Tatsuo Murakami groped to establish methods for breeding jellies, it became the best jellyfish museum in the worlds. The popularity of the Vivarium exploded when Osamu Shimomura received the Nobel Prize in Chemistry in 2008, thanks to the studies he led on Aequorea victoria, a jelly that contains a green fluorescent protein, with two American scientists: Martin Chalfie of Columbia University and Roger Tsien of the University of California-San Diego. He led his studies in Kamo, since at the time, it was the one of few marine museums displaying it. Researchers from the world, including the Paris Aquarium Cineaqua in France, come to learn about this breeding and raising.

With the light emission of the Aequorea victoria exhibited at the Kamo Aquarium
Osamu Shimomura won the 2008 Nobel Prize in Chemistry. It was also reported that the Green Fluorescent Protein that was the reason for the award was derived from Aequorea victoria. This attracted attention to the museum, which breeds Aequorea victoria, and the number of visitors to the museum increased to 1.5 to 2 times the normal number. [9] The adult jellyfish bred in the museum emit light when they are collected from the natural world, but they do not emit light when the generations are changed by artificial propagation. Upon hearing this, Shimomura called the museum directly on October 24, 2008, and advised that "if you mix coelenterazine with food, it will shine in two weeks." Then, with the introduction of Shimomura, he took over coelenterazine from Katsunori Teranishi, a professor at the Graduate School of Bioresources, Mie University, and worked on a luminescence experiment.

Northern elephant seal
A three-year-old 2.5-meter 273-kilogram female northern elephant seal was found on Sanze beach, Tsuruoka on 16 October 2017. She was weakened and injured but recovered after receiving antibiotics at this Aquarium, growing to over 400-kilogram in March 2018. She was named Naomi after a tennis player, Naomi Osaka by a public vote and has been exhibited in a pool at Kamo.

Exhibits

Jellies
Lion's mane jellyfish
Immortal jellyfish
Cyanea capillata Eschscholtz
Freshwater jellyfish
Habu-kurage
Glassy nautilus
Lychnorhiza lucerna
Acromitus maculosus
Jelly blubber
Egg-yolk jellyfish
Purple-striped jelly
Rhizostoma luteum
Blue jellyfish
Spotted jelly
Mastigias papua etpisoni
Atlantic sea nettle
Pacific sea nettle
Flame jellyfish
Beroe cucumis
Cassiopea
Bolinopsis mikado
Spirocodon saltator
Clinging jellyfish
Thimble jellyfish
Pelagia (cnidarian)
South American sea nettle
Pelagia noctiluca

Other sea creatures
Rhinobatos schlegelii
Asian sheepshead wrasse
Smooth lumpfish

Gallery

Jellyfish

Other creatures

Restaurant jellyfish menu
 
Jellyfish ramen - contains ground cannonball jellyfish.
Jellyfish sashimi
Jellyfish icecream

Access
From JR Tsuruoka Station, 30 minutes by Shōnai Kōtsu bus bound for Yunohama Onsen, adjacent to Kamo Suizokukan stop.

Notes

External links

 

Aquaria in Japan
Tsuruoka, Yamagata
Tourist attractions in Yamagata Prefecture
Buildings and structures in Yamagata Prefecture
Museums in Yamagata Prefecture